Tulbaghia natalensis, called pink wild garlic and sweet wild garlic (a name it shares with Tulbaghia simmleri), is a species of flowering plant in the family Amaryllidaceae, native to South Africa. It has gained the Royal Horticultural Society's Award of Garden Merit as an ornamental.

References

Allioideae
Endemic flora of South Africa
Flora of the Cape Provinces
Flora of KwaZulu-Natal
Plants described in 1891